Sigi is a mythical hero and a son of Odin in Norse legends.

Sigi or SIGI may also refer to:


Places
 Sigi River, Tanzania
 Sigi Regency, Sulawesi, Indonesia

People
 Sigi Schmid (1953–2018), German-American soccer coach
 Sigi Ziering (1928-2000), German-born American business executive, playwright and philanthropist
 Marjorie Lynette Sigley (1928–1997), British artist, writer, theatre director and television producer

Religion
 The Sigi (or Sigui) festival of the Dogon people of Mali. See Dogon religion

Other
 Space Integrated GPS/INS
 Social Institutions and Gender Index

See also
 Sigurður (for which Siggi is a nickname)